Jamie and the Magic Torch is a British children's television series made by Cosgrove Hall for Thames Television and shown on the ITV network, running from 1977 to 1979.

The series was written and narrated by Brian Trueman, who later wrote shows such as Danger Mouse and Count Duckula for Cosgrove Hall.

Premise
The programme is based around the young boy of the title and his torch. When shone on the floor, the torch opens up a hole into a fun fantasy dimension called Cuckoo Land.

The beginning of each episode has Jamie's mother tucking him into bed at night and saying, "Sleep well, Jamie." Then from under his bed, his pet Old English Sheepdog, Wordsworth, appears, holding the torch in his mouth. Jamie takes the torch and shines it on the floor, opening up a portal to Cuckoo Land (in which Wordsworth always gets stuck). The portal manifests itself as a helter skelter.

When they reach the end of the slide, they fly out into Cuckoo Land from the bottom of a tree trunk, and land on a trampoline. All of this is accompanied by a song, written by Joe Griffiths. Once in Cuckoo Land, the fun begins.

Characters in Cuckoo Land
 Mr. Boo, who flies around in his 'submachine', obsessed with counting things.
 Officer Gotcha, who rides a unicycle and eats truncheons.
 Strumpers Plunkett, who plays melodies on his trumpet nose.
 Wellibob the cat, who does everything backwards and speaks with a Glaswegian accent.
 Jo-Jo Help the unhelpful handyman.
 Nutmeg the ragdoll, whose magical pocket can produce all kinds of items.
 The Yoo-hoo Bird, who plays tricks on and runs from Officer Gotcha.
 Bullybundy, the show business rabbit with oversized feet.
 Arthur, a robot (series 3 only).

VHS releases

The first two series have also been released on DVD.

References

External links

British children's animated fantasy television series
ITV children's television shows
1977 British television series debuts
1979 British television series endings
1970s British children's television series
English-language television shows
Television shows produced by Thames Television
Television series by Fremantle (company)
Television series by FremantleMedia Kids & Family
1970s British animated television series
Television series by Cosgrove Hall Films